Irina Fetecău (born 17 April 1996) is a Romanian professional tennis player.

In her career, Fetecău has won three singles and four doubles titles on the ITF Women's Circuit. On 29 November 2021, she achieved her career-high singles ranking of world No. 207. On 28 January 2019, she peaked at No. 310 in the doubles rankings.

Fetecău made her WTA Tour main-draw debut at the 2019 Bucharest Open, having been handed a wildcard into the doubles event, partnering fellow Romanian Georgia Crăciun.

Grand Slam singles performance timelines

ITF Circuit finals

Singles: 10 (3 titles, 7 runner-ups)

Doubles: 8 (4 titles, 4 runner-ups)

References

External links
 
 

Romanian female tennis players
1996 births
Living people